Richard Meyers (born 1953), is an American author, ghostwriter, screenwriter, consultant, actor, editor, and teacher, who may be best known for his contributions to the martial arts film industry (Rim Films having called him "one of the men most responsible for the acceptance of Asian action movies and stars in America").

However, Meyers has been writing, editing, and performing professionally since 1974. He is the author of more than seventy novels and non-fiction books under variations of his own name, as well as several pseudonyms, such as Dane Hartman and Wade Barker.

His most successful and popular works include Doomstar, Fear Itself, Murder in Halruua, TV Detectives, For One Week Only: The World of Exploitation Films, and Martial Arts Movies: From Bruce Lee to the Ninjas—as well as both the book Films of Fury: The Kung Fu Movie Book, and the documentary Films of Fury: The Kung Fu Movie Movie. In addition, he has made contributions to such diverse paperback book series as The Destroyer, Dirty Harry, Ninja Master, and The Incredible Hulk.

Enjoying an eclectic life, Meyers has also entertained in film, television, arenas, major pop culture conventions, DVDs, radio, podcasts, and even in children's hospitals. He is also pleased to learn and teach writing, film, and kung-fu.

Early life 
Meyers was born in Connecticut, and he is the son of Stanley Meyers, who was one of the top executives in the field that is now known as Intellectual Disability and Mental Health – having served as the Northeast Regional Advisor for the National Association of Retarded Citizens as well as Pennsylvania's first state secretary for what is now known as Intellectual and Developmental Disability Services. Ric was raised by actress Vera Johnson, best known for playing the older version of Rosie O’Donnell's character in the 1992 film, A League of Their Own.

Early career 
Although pursuing theater and cinema studies at Emerson College, Boston University, and the University of Bridgeport, Meyers was already an inveterate reader and writer – leading to his being hired in 1974 as assistant editor at Seaboard Periodicals and Atlas Comics. After the company folded in 1975, Meyers decided to pursue a writing career rather than return to college, hoping, like one of his idols, Donald E. Westlake, to create work in as many genres as he enjoyed reading.

With the help of his Seaboard Peridicals/Atlas Comics superior, Jeff Rovin, Meyers authored such non-fiction books as TV Super Stars, The Illustrated Soap Opera Companion, Movies on Movies, The Great Science Fiction Films, and The World of Fantasy Films. After their publication, he moved on to film and television genres he enjoyed even more, creating award-winning works on TV detectives and exploitation films. At around the same time, he was hired to be the first ghostwriter for the best-selling paperback series The Destroyer, and shortly after went on to write more than two dozen paperbacks for several publishers in the police, martial arts, and war action genres. At the same time, he was pursuing genre work under variations of his own name, including two science fiction novels, three horror novels, and a fantasy mystery for the Forgotten Realms series of Dungeons and Dragons.

At the same time he continued to ply the editing trade, serving on the staffs of such publications as Starlog, Famous Monsters of Filmland, The Armchair Detective, and Millimeter magazine, among others. He was also head writer for the first issue of Fangoria, as well as the official tie-in magazines for the movies Moonraker and Alien.

Enter the Film Dragon 
Although Meyers had seen Enter the Dragon and Five Fingers of Death in 1973, martial art movies held no interest for him until ex-Atlas Comics artist/writer Larry Hama introduced him to samurai and kung-fu cinema in 1978. In short order, Meyers had secured his first contract to write a book on the subject, and was soon in Hong Kong meeting Jackie Chan, which led to his inspiring Jonathan Ross to make a documentary on the kung fu star as part of his Son of the Incredibly Strange Film Show series in the UK. Upon its broadcast on the Discovery Network in the U.S., the English-speaking interest in kung-fu films was refreshed.

Meyers continued to promote the film genre in every medium he could, becoming a contributing editor for Inside Kung Fu magazine until it ceased publication in 2011, updating his book as Martial Arts Movies From Bruce Lee to Jackie Chan & More in 2001, appearing on Bruce Lee and Jackie Chan specials for A&E's Biography and Bravo Profiles, and contributing audio commentaries, liner notes, and cover copy for hundreds of DVDs in Asia and America.

Meyers hosted his first San Diego Comic Con Superhero Kung Fu Extravaganza in 1997, and recently prepared its 20th Anniversary Celebration for 2017. An artist seeing the Extravaganza led to Meyers being asked to present kung fu seminars to the staff of the first Kung Fu Panda film, as well as its subsequent Nickelodeon TV series.

Stage Appearances 
Although predominantly a writer, Meyers occasionally tires of typing, which has led to him playing the king at the Medieval Times Dinner and Tournament in Lyndhurst, New Jersey, for almost two years. Shortly after, he was approached to appear as a certain jolly old elf in malls, stores, churches, homes, and even a dozen children's hospitals via video.

Awards and honors 
Meyers has been inducted into The World Martial Arts Hall of Fame, the World Wide Martial Arts Hall of Fame, the Budo Magazine Hall of Fame, and the Action Martial Arts Magazine Hall of Fame, and received an Edgar Allan Poe Special Award by the Mystery Writers of America.

1953 births
Living people
Martial arts writers